Kuliki is a rural locality (a village) in Kultayevskoye Rural Settlement, Permsky District, Perm Krai, Russia. The population was 26 as of 2010. There are 24 streets.

Geography 
Kuliki is located 43 km southwest of Perm (the district's administrative centre) by road. Denisyata is the nearest rural locality.

References 

Rural localities in Permsky District